Meyer's Little Toot is a homebuilt biplane that was designed by George W. Meyer (1916–1982) of Corpus Christi, Texas.

Design and development
Design of the original Little Toot was started by George Meyer in 1952. Along with drawings, a scale model was built of the aircraft during the design phase. It was designed with aerobatics in mind and is stressed for 10g+/- loads.

The Little Toot is a single seat, open cockpit, biplane with conventional landing gear. Its design accommodates an optional cockpit canopy. The fuselage is welded steel tubing aluminum covering. The original tail section is a metal monocoque truss section from a Luscome 8A. The wings use spruce spars with wooden ribs and are fabric covered. The upper wing is swept back eight degrees. The lower wing has 2.5 degrees of dihedral with nearly full-length ailerons. The landing gear and wheel pants were sourced from a Cessna 140 tail-dragger. The production cost of the original Little Toot aircraft was 2,000 in 1958.

The aircraft was named Little Toot after the tugboat that liked doing figure eights in a Disney movie, itself based on a children's story written and illustrated by Hardie Gramatky.

Operational history

The Little Toot prototype was first displayed at the 1957 Experimental Aircraft Association convention in Milwaukee, Wisconsin. At this event, Little Toot, N61G, won the Mechanix Illustrated Trophy for Outstanding Achievement, First Place and Second Place for Outstanding Design. EAA founder Paul Poberezny flew Little Toot several times.

Specifications

See also

References

External links

Homebuilt aircraft
Biplanes
1950s United States experimental aircraft